Crișana Oradea was a football club based in Oradea, Romania. It was founded in 1929 and dissolved in 1954.

History

The club was founded in 1929. The players from the first year of existence were: Putirică, Combi, Aurel, Bulzan, Restea, Slopu, Vanghelu, Blondu, Ștefănescu, Matei, I. Bonațiu, Mureșan, Magău, Budău, Cionca.

In 1930–31, the club won the North League, but was eliminated in the preliminary round of the final tournament by Societatea Gimnastică Sibiu. In 1931–32 it again won the North League but was again eliminated in the preliminary round of the final tournament, this time by Mureșul Târgu Mureș.

In 1932 the club started playing in the First Division, finishing until 1938, in the first half of the championship. Notable players included: Püllöck, I. Budău, I. Bonațiu, Pintea, Bugariu, Frenţiu, I. Baratky, E. Lakatos, C. Deleanu, Țuțuianu, Ad. Bocșa, Al. Torjoc, P. Malița, Pop, Aştilean, Lucaci, Fr. Dvorysák, Țăranu, Ladislau Dallos, Szilágy.

In 1938–39 and 1939–40 the club played in the Second Division. After World War II, it reappeared in the Second Division, merging with CFR, the new name being CFR. In 1947, the two clubs split again, only CFR remaining, but not for long, because in 1954 it was relegated to the regional championship, and with this, it disappeared.

In 1961 the Crișana name reappeared, but only because CA Oradea changed its name, with no connection between them.

Honours

Liga I:
Winners (0): Best finnish: 3rd–4th 1933–34

Liga II:
Winners (1): 1939–40

Association football clubs established in 1929
Association football clubs disestablished in 1947
Defunct football clubs in Romania
Football clubs in Bihor County
Sport in Oradea
Liga I clubs
Liga II clubs
Oradea
1929 establishments in Romania
1947 disestablishments in Romania